Epic Meal Time is a Canadian YouTube cooking show known for creating extremely high-calorie meals, generally out of meat products (with particular emphasis on bacon) and including alcohol (especially Jack Daniel's). The series began in Montreal, Quebec, the group's place of origin, but recently, episodes have been filmed in California, where several guest stars, such as Tony Hawk and Smosh, made appearances. Since October 2010, new episodes have been released every Tuesday, with a few exceptions.

Starting on October 19, 2012 on different days, Epic Meal Time broadcasts "Throwback Thursday" or "Flashback Friday" episodes, which are previous episodes with Pop-Up Video-style facts added. In the earlier episodes before his Muscles Glasses persona was created, Alex Perrault's eyes are blocked by a bacon strip while his voice is distorted.

In December 2012, Epic Meal Time spawned a spin-off series titled Epic Chef, inspired by the Food Network series Chopped and hosted by Harley Morenstein. In this series, two chefs have 45 minutes to create a meal using three secret ingredients, a briefcase full of bacon, and the featured alcoholic drink of the day. These episodes are not listed here, as they are not considered Epic Meal Time episodes.

A second spin-off series, Handle It, premiered on March 22, 2013. These episodes, each hosted by one or more members of the main cast, present step-by-step instructions for preparing various recipes with the equipment and methods commonly used in the main series. Handle It episodes are not listed here.

In July 2014, Epic Meal Time debuted their TV series Epic Meal Empire on FYI.

Food energy listings, such as calorie and fat content, are provided in most episodes; not all episodes have this information, due to either insufficient data or not being applicable (as is in the case of 'deleted scenes' episodes).

2010

2011

2012

2013

2014

2015
Starting with episode #284, the "Next time, we eat..." ending is no longer used. Also, starting with episode #286, episodes end with a plug for Harley's YouTube channel unless otherwise noted.

2016
Starting with #306, episodes include commentary from the guys as they eat the finished product. Starting with #311, episodes do not end with a plug for Harley's YouTube channel unless otherwise noted.

2017

References

Epic Meal Time
Videographies of YouTubers
Viral videos